Nyang Luol Wek III (born 9 March 1996) is a South Sudanese basketball player who currently plays for Cobra Sport of the Basketball Africa League (BAL).

Early life and high school career
Wek was born in South Sudan but moved to the United States at age 9. He attended French Camp Academy in Mississippi, where he began playing basketball as a freshman. As a junior, Wek averaged 19 points per game and had consecutive 40-point games. He was expelled during his senior season. Wek moved to Memphis, Tennessee and earned a football scholarship to Lane College. He dropped out of Lane after a season, due to feeling that football was not right for him. Wek moved to Dallas, Texas and found work delivering plumbing supplies.

Professional career
Wek played with the Dallas Ballers in the first season of the Junior Basketball Association (JBA). His girlfriend spotted the ad for the tryout and sent it to him. He was suspended for three games due to a conflict with another player.

On March 2, 2022, Wek signed with South Sudanese club Cobra Sport of the Basketball Africa League (BAL).

National team career
Wek was on the South Sudan national basketball team for AfroBasket 2021. As a starter, he contributed 5 points and 2.5 rebounds per game, helping South Sudan reach the quarterfinals.

BAL career statistics

|-
|style="text-align:left;"|2022
|style="text-align:left;"|Cobra Sport
| 5 || 3 || 25.8 || .419 || .320 || .286 || 5.8 || 1.4 || 1.6 || .4 || 9.6
|- class="sortbottom"
| style="text-align:center;" colspan="2"|Career
| 5 || 3 || 25.8 || .419 || .320 || .286 || 5.8 || 1.4 || 1.6 || .4 || 9.6

References

External links
Nyang Wek at Eurobasket.com

1996 births
Cobra Sport players
Living people
Small forwards
Junior Basketball Association players
Lane College alumni
South Sudanese men's basketball players